Lavender Bay is a harbourside suburb on the lower North Shore of Sydney, New South Wales, Australia. Lavender Bay is located 3 kilometres north of the Sydney central business district, in the local government area of North Sydney Council.

The suburb takes its name from Lavender Bay, a natural feature of Port Jackson (Sydney Harbour) immediately west of the Sydney Harbour Bridge. It lies between Milsons Point and McMahons Point.  The suburb North Sydney is located, to the north. Lavender Bay is a residential suburb with expansive views of Sydney Harbour.

History

Lavender Bay was named after the Boatswain (bosun), George Lavender, from the prison hulk "Phoenix", which was moored there for many years. The bay is dual-named Gooweebahree, (also sometimes written as Quiberee) in the Dharug language of the local inhabitants, the Cammeraygal people of the Eora nation. The colonists also called it Hulk Bay and sometimes Phoenix Bay. George Lavender lived on  adjacent to the property of Billy Blue.
On 30 May 1915 Lavender Bay railway station was opened to take the place of Milsons Point railway station. This only lasted for seven weeks, as passengers refused to alight here and demanded that trains stop at Milsons Point.   During the harbour bridge construction, Lavender Bay Station was the terminus for the North Shore Line.  The area is now railway storage sidings.

Heritage listings
Lavender Bay has a number of heritage-listed sites, including:
 1 Walker Street: Brett Whiteley House

Population
In the 2016 Census, there were 941 people in Lavender Bay. 57.2% of people were born in Australia and 76.1% of people spoke only English at home. The most common responses for religion were No Religion 33.4% and Catholic 26.4%.

Landmarks
 A wharf is located in the bay which provides access to private vessels.
 The Lavender Bay Baths (1910), also known as Cavill's Baths, a tidal swimming pool, were once popular with swimmers, located in the area beside the ferry wharf.
 Wendy Whiteley created a garden adjacent to her home, in the area between Clark Park and the old railway line. It is sometimes known as Wendy's Secret Garden, and is open to the public.

Churches
 Christ Church, Lavender Bay, a Lower North Shore landmark.
 The Jesuit Church of St Francis Xavier was founded in 1856 and is now part of North Sydney Parish.

Notable residents
 Sir Donald Bradman lived in the harbourfront Bay View Street, and was one of the first few Australians to get a private telephone number while living in Bay View Street.
Artist Norman Lindsay lived at 'Heidelberg' at 9 Bay View Street; another artist, John Firth-Smith, occupied this same house many decades later.
 Artist Brett Whiteley lived in a house overlooking the Bay with his wife Wendy Whiteley; Wendy continued to live there . In 2018 the NSW Government granted heritage status to the Whiteleys' house, its views of Sydney Harbour, and Wendy's remarkable Secret Garden in recognition of the significance of the place to the history of Australian art.

References

 
Suburbs of Sydney